The Cranes Nest River is a  river in the U.S. state of Virginia. It is located in Dickenson County in the southwestern part of the state. It is part of the Mississippi River watershed.

See also
List of rivers of Virginia

References

USGS Hydrologic Unit Map - State of Virginia (1974)

Rivers of Virginia
Bodies of water of Dickenson County, Virginia